A timeline of notable events relating to BBC Radio 5 Live, and its predecessor BBC Radio 5.

Radio 5

1980s and 1990s
1988
The Conservative government of the time wants the BBC to end its longstanding practice of simulcasting its national services on both AM and FM.
9 October – The BBC announces that a fifth national network will launch on the MW frequencies of BBC Radio 2.

1989
No events.

1990
15 August – Ahead of the launch of BBC Radio 5, BBC Radio 2 begins to wind down its transmissions on MW by broadcasting a daytime information service providing advice about how to listen to Radio 2 on FM. The service includes trailers for the new station.
27 August – BBC Radio 5 launches at 9am. The station is on air from 6am until just after midnight but only broadcasts its own live programming at peak times (breakfast plus weekday mid-mornings and drivetime) alongside sport on weekend afternoons and youth programmes on weeknight evenings. The rest of its airtime is taken up with programming which had previously been broadcast as FM opt-outs on Radio 4 (schools, adult education and children's programmes), programmes from the World Service and simulcasts of the BBC's other national stations.
28 August – The first edition of the station's weekday breakfast programme Morning Edition is broadcast. It is presented by Sarah Ward and Jon Briggs.

1991
7 January – Sue McGarry and Julian Worricker replace Martin Kelner as presenters of drivetime show Five Aside.
17 January–2 March – Radio 4 News FM, the first rolling BBC radio news service is on air during the first Gulf War. The service is deemed to be so successful that bosses begin looking at ways to launch a full-time news radio station.
30 March – Radio 5 starts broadcasting its own programmes between 11pm and midnight, replacing an hour of programmes from the World Service.
2 September – Radio 5 launches a weekday lunchtime programme in conjunction with forces station BFBS. Called BFBS Worldwide, the programme continues to be broadcast until the demise of Radio 5 in 1994.
5 October – Football phone-in 6-0-6 is broadcast for the first time. Danny Baker is the programme's host. The launch of this programme is part of an expansion of Radio 5's programming. Consequently, the station no longer simulcasts the BBC's other radio stations although programming from the World Service continues to be broadcast, albeit less than before.

1992
6 January – The first edition of The AM Alternative is broadcast. The new programme, presented by Johnnie Walker, is on air every weekday and replaces the three separate shows, This Family Edition, Sound Advice and The Health Show which had previously occupied the mid-morning slot.
17 February – Danny Baker replaces Sarah Ward and Jon Briggs as presenter of the weekday breakfast programme Morning Edition.
15 May – World Service programmes are broadcast on weekday afternoons for the final time.
10–26 June – For the first time, the BBC provides full radio coverage of an international football tournament when it broadcasts live commentary of every game of Euro 92.
25 July–9 August – Radio 5 provides full live coverage of the 1992 Summer Olympics. Programmes run all day, from 6:30am until 10pm. This is the first time that BBC Radio has provided full live coverage of the Games.
15 August – Mark Curry takes over the weekend breakfast show. The new programme is called Weekend Edition. He had previously presented the Saturday morning children's programme On Your Marks which had recently been replaced with two separate programmes Get Set and Go!.

1993
May – The broadcasting arrangements for Test Match Special for the 1993 cricket season see Radio 5 broadcasting the morning play with the afternoon session remaining on BBC Radio 3 although Radio 5 does provide extended, but not full, commentary during weekday editions of Sport on 5.
25 October – John Inverdale joins to present a new sports drivetime show, John Inverdale’s Drive-In. It replaces Five Aside which had been on air since the station launched.
1 November – Liz Kershaw presents the first edition of a new lunchtime show called The Crunch. Consequently, BFBS Worldwide moves to the mid-afternoon slot.
November – Michele Stevens replaces Danny Baker as the presenter of Morning Edition.
The BBC announces that Radio 5, criticised by Director-General of the BBC John Birt as "improvised and disjointed", will relaunch as a combined news and sport station after plans to launch a news only service on BBC Radio 4’s long wave frequency are dropped after widespread opposition.

1994
27 March – BBC Radio 5 signs off at just after midnight after three and a half years on air.

Radio 5 Live

1990s
1994
28 March – At 5am, Jane Garvey launches BBC Radio 5 Live. The new 24-hour station replaces the mix of sport, magazine programmes, educational and children's programmes with a new rolling news service, whilst retaining the sports coverage from Radio 5. Other launch presenters include Adrian Chiles, Peter Allen, Diana Madill, Eddie Mair and Sybil Ruscoe. John Inverdale,  Liz Kershaw and Julian Worricker transfer from Radio 5 to the new station.
29 March – The first edition of Up All Night is broadcast.

1995
27 September – The BBC begins regular Digital Audio Broadcasting, initially just from the Crystal Palace transmitting station. Radio 5 Live is one of the stations carried on the new service and this allows the station to be heard in a higher quality sound when compared to MW.

1996
Eddie Mair leaves.

1997
3 May – Brian Hayes takes over as weekend breakfast presenter.
6 May – Julian Worricker moves from weekend breakfast to replace John Inverdale as host of John Inverdale Nationwide, now renamed Nationwide.
October – Nicky Campbell joins the station to present the mid-morning show.

1998
BBC Local Radio stations start carrying 5 Live when they are not on air. Consequently, the station is heard regularly on FM for the first time, albeit only during overnight hours.
22 March – 5 Live's late night news bulletin News Extra and phone-in/talk show After Hours are broadcast for the final time. The next day, a new three-hour late show called Late Night Live launches and Up All Night is extended to become a four-hour show.
28 March – Edwina Currie joins to present the weekend late evening show, called Late Night Currie.
4 September – Jane Garvey takes over as host of Nationwide for its final few episodes.
14 September – Peter Allen joins Jane Garvey for the renamed drivetime show 5 Live Drive which replaces Nationwide. Julian Worricker takes over the breakfast programme. Victoria Derbyshire joins him later in September as co-presenter.

1999
26 March – Sybil Ruscoe leaves. She is replaced on the weekday afternoon show by Ian Payne.
3 April – The first edition of the weekend world news programme Global is broadcast.
4 April – Radio 5 Live launches a new "Sunday Service of morning political news", hosted by Fi Glover.

2000s
2000
July – Bob Shennan replaces Roger Mosey as Controller.
Kevin Greening joins.

2001
8 May – Simon Mayo joins the station to present the afternoon programme and the weekly Friday afternoon show Kermode and Mayo's Film Review as Mark Kermode also joins the station.
July – Aasmah Mir joins on a full-time basis having previously done news reading shifts as a freelance journalist.
Radio 5 Live, along with other BBC radio stations, stop broadcasting via Sky's analogue satellite service.

2002
2 February – BBC Radio 5 Live Sports Extra launches.
6 April – The Weekend News is first broadcast. Initially presented by Matthew Bannister and Caroline Feraday, the new programme replaces Global.
29 April – Wake Up to Money which had previously been part of Morning Reports, becomes a programme in its own right and is extended from 15 to 30 minutes. Consequently, Morning Reports now broadcasts for 30 minutes.

2003
 4 January – Richard Evans and Aasmah Mir take over as presenters of The Weekend News.
 13 January – Nicky Campbell replaces Julian Worricker as co-host of the breakfast show and Fi Glover replaces Nicky as mid-morning presenter. Julian takes on a revamped Sunday morning programme, which replaces the Sunday Service. Also, Matthew Bannister takes over the late show, replacing Fi Glover.
 July – Julian Worricker takes over the mid-morning show from Fi Glover.
 10 August – Edwina Currie presents her weekend programme Late Night Currie for the final time.
 October – The first series of Fighting Talk is broadcast.

2004
 August – Victoria Derbyshire takes over the mid-morning show.

2005
 16 July – Stephen Nolan joins to present the weekend late evening phone-in show.
 8–12 September – 5 Live devotes its daytime schedule to broadcast extensive live coverage of the deciding Ashes cricket match. Normally, the station provides reports into its regular programmes.

2006
 Sport on 5 is renamed 5 live Sport.
 22 April – Lesley Ashmall and John Pienaar replace Aasmah Mir as presenters of The Weekend News with Aasmah taking over presenting duties on The Midday News.

2007
 29 July – Long running obituary programme Brief Lives is broadcast for the final time.
 September – Jane Garvey leaves to become the new presenter of Woman’s Hour on BBC Radio 4.
 9 October Anita Anand joins Peter Allen as the new presenter of 5 Live Drive.
 November – Richard Bacon returns to the station to present the late evening show.

2008
 April – Adrian Van Klaveren replaces Bob Shennan as Controller.

2009
 9 January – The Midday News is broadcast for the final time.
 12 January – Nicky Campbell takes over the morning phone-in following its incorporation into an extended breakfast show. The mid-morning show is pushed back an hour, running from 10am until 1 pm.
 January – Comedy talk show 7 Day Sunday is broadcast for the first time.
 5 September – Danny Baker begins presenting a new Saturday morning sports-based chat show. He had rejoined the station a year earlier to become one of the presenters of 6-0-6.
 18 December – Simon Mayo presents the weekday afternoon show for the final time. However he continues to present the weekly Friday afternoon show Kermode and Mayo's Film Review.

2010s
2010
 11 January – Tony Livesey joins to present the late evening show, replacing Richard Bacon who takes over the afternoon programme and Gabby Logan launches a new lunchtime show.
 1 February Aasmah Mir joins Peter Allen as the new presenter of Drive, replacing Anita Anand.
 5 September – Long running evening news programme The Weekend News ends and is replaced by hour-long programmes, including 5 Live Investigates presented by Adrian Goldberg, Pienaar's Politics presented by John Pienaar and a new business show On the Money presented by Declan Curry.

2011
 April – Shelagh Fogarty replaces Gabby Logan as host of the lunchtime show. Also, Anna Foster replaces Rachel Burden as host of the weekend breakfast show – Rachel moves to become co-host of the weekday breakfast show from 3 May, replacing Shelagh Fogerty.
 Autumn – The station moves to MediaCityUK in Salford.
 25 October – The BBC announces that, from next season, it will axe the second commentator for football matches as a cost-cutting measure.

2012
 27 July – 12 August – 5 Live operates a temporary station – 5 Live Olympics Extra – to provide additional coverage of the 2012 Summer Olympics.
 August – The Non-League Football Show launches as a national programme, presented by Caroline Barker. It had previously been broadcast on BBC Radio London since 2006.
 14 November – Anna Foster joins Peter Allen as the new presenter of 5 Live Drive, replacing Aasmah Mir.

2013
 19 February – Jonathan Wall replaces Adrian Van Klaveren as Controller.
 April – Tony Livesey becomes the weekend breakfast show host.
 13 May – Phil Williams takes over the weekday late evening show.
 16 May – Debut of Question Time Extra Time. The programme, which includes a simulcasted audio broadcast of the evening's edition of BBC One's Question Time, is presented by Stephen Nolan and John Pienaar, who, after the broadcast, take a look at the topics raised.
 28 September – Charlotte Green reads the classified football results for the first time. She replaces James Alexander Gordon who retired in July who had read the results since 1974.

2014
 Wake Up to Money is extended from 30 minutes to 45 minutes. Consequently, Morning Reports is shortened from 30 minutes to 15 minutes.
 May – 5 Live Science, produced and presented by The Naked Scientists, debuts as a podcast and a weekend early morning programme.
 1 July – BBC Radio 5 Live announces the departure of Richard Bacon, Victoria Derbyshire and Shelagh Fogarty, who will leave when the station's schedule is overhauled in the autumn.
 6 October – The schedule changes are rolled out. Adrian Chiles and Peter Allen take on the mid morning show, called 5 Live Daily each covering different days in the week, Dan Walker and Sarah Brett launch Afternoon Edition and Tony Livesey joins Anna Foster as the new 5 Live Drive presenter.  The news schedule also sees the first sitting of The Friday Sports Panel.
 November – Emma Barnett, women's editor of The Daily Telegraph joins. She presents a new Sunday evening programme called Hit List, a countdown of the 40 highest profile online news stories of the week.

2015
 1 October – Plans to expand sister station Sports Extra are dropped for a second time over concerns over the impact it would have on commercial rivals such as TalkSPORT.

2016
 August – The Non-League Football Show ends when the BBC decides not to commission any more shows.
 September – Peter Allen and Jane Garvey are reunited to host a new Sunday evening show, Emma Barnett becomes the Wednesday to Friday host of 5 Live Daily and Nihal Arthanayake replaces Dan Walker as co-host of Afternoon Edition.

2017
 19 June – Launch of Brexitcast, a BBC podcast looking at Brexit-related issues. It is also aired by BBC Radio 5 Live.

2018
 January – Changes to the weekday mid-morning show take place. The Five Live Daily name is dropped. The Monday to Thursday editions are renamed The Emma Barnett Show  to co-inside with Emma Barnett taking over the programme and Adrian Chiles hosts the Friday show which is called Chiles on Friday.

2019
 21 January – On what would have been presenter Rachel Bland's 41st birthday, BBC Radio 5 Live launches the Rachel Bland New Podcasting Award, designed to encourage new broadcasting talent.
 8 May – Phil Williams present his final late night show, leaving the station after 18 years.
 9 May – Danny Baker is dismissed from his presenting role at BBC Radio 5 Live after he appeared to mock the racial heritage of the Duchess of Sussex by sharing on social media an image of a couple holding hands with a chimpanzee dressed in clothes with the caption: "Royal Baby leaves hospital". The BBC describes the incident as a "serious error of judgement". He is replaced by Geoff Lloyd.
 31 May – A new Friday afternoon entertainment show launches, presented by Elis James and John Robins. Consequently, the Friday edition of 5 Live Drive is reduced in length, starting an hour later, at 5pm.
 13 June – The BBC announces it has commissioned its award-winning Brexitcast podcast for television, launching on BBC One in September.
 September – Heidi Dawson replaces Jonathan Wall as Station Controller.

2020s
2020
 29 January – BBC News announces it will shed 450 posts, including roles from BBC Radio 5 Live, as part of £80m worth of savings being made by the BBC. The changes will include the ending of Morning Reports which had been on air since the station launched in 1994 and weekend live content on Up All Night will be reduced.
 1 February – Following the UK's departure from the European Union, the final edition of Brexitcast, recorded as a podcast for radio and titled "Over and Out!", is released.
 6 February – Newscast makes its debut, replacing Brexitcast.
 19 March – Rhod Sharp presents Up All Night for the final time. He had presented the programme for more than 25 years, which launched when 5 Live started broadcasting in March 1994.
 23 March –
 In order to prioritise resources during the Coronavirus pandemic, 5 Live suspends overnight programmes between 1 a.m. and 5 a.m. and carries the output of BBC Radio London. This continued until early July when 5 Live resumed its overnight programming with Dotun Adebayo replacing Rhod Sharp, and the programme no longer being called Up All Night.
 Having been on air since Radio 5 Live launched, Morning Reports, the 5am news bulletin, is axed as part of cost cutting measures. The bulletin is replaced by an extended Wake Up to Money, which now broadcasts for the full 5am hour.
 6 July – BBC Radio 5 Live stops relaying overnight broadcasting from BBC Radio London on weeknights, and launches a new weekday phone-in discussion show presented by Dotun Adebayo from 1am–5am. The World Football Phone-In and Virtual Jukebox, regular features from his weekend presenting role on Up All Night, are carried over to the new programme, which is simulcast on local radio. 5 Live continues to simulcast BBC Radio London on Friday and Saturday overnights.
 10 December –
 Emma Barnett leaves.
 Question Time Extra Time is broadcast for the final time.

2021
 7 January – Adrian Chiles is confirmed as presenter of BBC Radio 5 Live's weekday mid-morning show on Thursdays and Fridays, replacing Emma Barnett. with Naga Munchetty presenting the show Monday to Wednesday.
 9–11 April – Following the death of Prince Philip, Duke of Edinburgh, BBC Radio 5 Live abandons half its regular Friday, Saturday, and Sunday weekend programming in favour of simulcasting the BBC Radio News special programme and from 5:10pm the station broadcasts a revised schedule for the rest of the day and over the weekend.
 11 September – Hayley Hasell begins hosting the weekend overnight programme.
 12 August – Anna Foster presents her final 5 Live Drive show before moving to Beirut as a Middle East correspondent for BBC News.
 5 November – Nicky Campbell presents his final Breakfast Show on BBC Radio 5 Live. He had co-presented the programme for the past 18 years.
 8 November – Rick Edwards joins Rachel Burden to present a new look breakfast show. Rick replaces Nicky Campbell, who moves to a new mid-morning slot.

2022
 March – BBC Radio 5 Live Sports Extra is renamed as Radio 5 Sports Extra as part of a rebranding of the BBC.
 24 March – For a temporary period, between 1am and 5am, BBC Radio 5 Live stops broadcasting overnight and rebroadcasts BBC World Service's programmes instead. This continues until 2nd April.
 1 April – The final edition of Kermode and Mayo's Film Review is broadcast on BBC Radio 5 Live after 21 years on air. The show will be replaced by an extended 5 Live Drive.
 26 May – BBC Director-General Tim Davie announces plans for an annual £500m of savings that will see the closure of BBC Radio 5 Live's medium wave service by the end of 2027.
 6 August – As the 2022–23 English football season gets under way, the Saturday afternoon classified football results are absent from BBC Radio 5 Live's Sports Report. On 8 August the station announces it has dropped the results, read by Charlotte Green, from the programme because it has been shortened to make way for the 5.30pm Live Premier League coverage.
 13 August – BBC Radio Scotland presenter Laura McGhie begins presenting weekend overnights on BBC Radio 5 Live.
 14 August – A new Sunday morning show begins on BBC Radio 5 Live, with Helen Skelton replacing Laura Whitmore as the presenter. 
 3 September – Patrick Kielty succeeds Scott Mills and Chris Stark as presenter of the Saturday morning programme on BBC Radio 5 Live.
 8–19 September – Following the death of Queen Elizabeth II, BBC Radio 5 Live abandons half its regular scheduled programming in favour of simulcasting a BBC Radio News special programme. and the station broadcasts a revised schedule from 9 to 12 September and on 19 September the day of the funeral.
 8 October–12 November – Radio 5 Live and Radio 5 Live Extra air coverage of the 2021 Women's Rugby World Cup after the BBC secured exclusive UK audio rights to the competition. Coverage also appears on BBC Sounds. This is the first time that a women's rugby union tournament has received full live coverage on British radio, with Sonja McLaughlin, Sara Orchard and Laura McGhie presenting coverage.

References

BBC Radio 5 Live
Radio 5 Live